Airwolf 3D is a Costa Mesa, California-based company that produces 3D printers.

History

Airwolf was founded in May 2012 by Erick Wolf, a garage mechanic and patent attorney with a mechanical engineering degree, and his wife Eva.  The inspiration for the company came from a 3D printer that Erick bought just before Christmas 2011.  After encountering difficulty with his goal of getting the printer to print replacement parts for itself, he spent several days working on the printer before determining that it wasn't able to complete the task.  The printer was eventually scrapped for parts, and Erick instead began building his own printer, which was named the Airwolf 3D.

The original Airwolf printer (v.4) was derived from the Prusa Mendel and Mecano Air designs, hence the name "Airwolf."

The company started shipping fully assembled 3D printers in June 2012 from their garage in Newport Beach, California.  The first printer was sold to Lars Brubaker and Kevin Pope of MatterHackers.  MatterHackers went on to develop MatterControl, 3D printing software that works with many 3D printers and is offered in a customized version for Airwolf 3D.

Airwolf's customer base includes Boeing, John Deere, Raytheon, Saleen Automotive and Honeywell — as well as schools and home hobbyists.

Products

AW3D 5.5

The AW3D 5.5 was introduced in late 2012 and superseded the v.4 and v.5.

AW3D XL

The AW3D XL was introduced in January 2013.  The maximum printing surface is approximately 12"x 8"x 7".  It operates on a RAMBo board made by Ultimachine which offers options for expandability, such as a dual extruder, multiple fans, and several other features including direct heatbed control.  The XL 3D printer plays an integral part in “STEAM” academic curricula in Orange Unified School District.

AW3D HD

The AW3D HD was introduced in November 2013 at the 3D Print Show in Paris, France.  It featured a print area of approximately 12"x8"x12." The AW3D HD featured a print volume of 12" x 8" x 12" (1150in³) and had a layer-to-layer resolution of .06mm (.002"). The HD was equipped with a single print head that came standard with a .5mm nozzle or a .35mm nozzle as an option.

AW3D HDL

The AW3D HDL was the Airwolf 3D base model 3D printer which could be upgraded depending on the user's needs. It was equipped with an un-heated print bed and a single print head capable of sustained temperatures of 260°C (500°F). The AW3D had a print resolution of .08mm with a maximum print speed of 150mm/s. The AW3D had a build volume of 12" x 8" x 11" (1056in³) and came standard with .5mm print nozzle or a .35mm nozzle optional.

AW3D HDx

The AW3D HDx was introduced in May 2014. It is a 3D printer can build prototypes out of engineering-grade materials like polycarbonate, bridge nylon and nylon 645.  The HDx uses the company's JRx hot end and can continuously hold temperatures of up to 599°F, which allows 3D printing in more durable materials.  The HDx was selected as Editor's Pick of the Week by Desktop Engineering. The HDX had a print volume of 12" x 8" x 12" (1150in³) and had a layer-to-layer resolution of .06mm (.002"). The HDX came was equipped with the proprietary JRx high-temperature print head and came standard with a .5mm nozzle or an optional .35mm nozzle.

AW3D HD2x

The AW3D HD2x was a dual-head 3D printer that was introduced in 2014. The HD2x featured a dual print head capable of sustained temperatures of 315 °C(599 °F). The original HD2x was designed for traditional hard-wired printing and slicing functionality; however, wireless capability was later provided by Airwolf 3D's Wolfbox™ wireless controller.  The HD2x was capable of printing in two different colors or two different materials simultaneously provided that the two materials had similar extruding temperatures. The HD2x had a print volume of 11" X 8" x 12" (1056in³) and offered a layer-to-layer resolution as fine as .06mm (.002").

AW3D HD-R

The AW3D HD-R was introduced at the 2015 Consumer Electronics Show.  The HD-R was the first Airwolf 3D model to offer integrated WiFi and cloud based slicing, file storage, and file management based on the AstroPrint® platform by 3DaGoGo®. The HD-R could be interfaced via a traditional PC connection or a mobile device. By default an 8” tablet was supplied with the each unit for wireless interface. The HD-R came equipped with dual print heads each capable of sustained temperatures of 315°C (599°F). The dual print head configuration allowed the user to print with two different colors or two different types of filament provided that the filaments had similar extruding temperatures. The HD-R was built with an improved aluminum backbone for rigidity and had a maximum build envelope of 11”x 8”x 12” (1056 in³). The HD-R had a print resolution of .06mm (.002") and came standard with a .5mm nozzle or an optional .35mm nozzle.

AXIOM

The first in the AXIOM line is made from extruded aluminum and injection molded polycarbonate parts.  It has a large build volume of 12.5”x8”x10”, can print layers as fine as 40 microns, and its heated bed, along with the company's proprietary hot end, allow the AXIOM to print in a wide variety of materials, from PLA to Nylon and polycarbonate.  And, with the integration of cloud printer management system AstroPrint, the AXIOM can be controlled via the web, as well as USB, micro SD card, or Ethernet.

Wolfbite 
Wolfbite is a 3D printing adhesive to facilitate the bonding and removal of nylon and nylon blend prints from glass and ceramic build plates. The product was formulated to solve the problems of warping and adhesion that are inherent when 3D printing with nylon.

Specifications

Many components are fabricated using acrylonitrile butadiene styrene (ABS), a common thermoplastic.

See also
List of 3D printer manufacturers

References

3D printer companies
Manufacturing companies based in Greater Los Angeles
Technology companies based in Greater Los Angeles
2012 establishments in California
American companies established in 2012
Technology companies established in 2012
Companies based in Costa Mesa, California
Fused filament fabrication
Privately held companies based in California